The Samsung REX series is a range of Samsung smartphones and feature phones, ranging from low to mid-end phones, running a Java-based operating system with Samsung's TouchWiz user interface. It was one of the Samsung line of devices that are aimed at the budget phone market alongside lower end Samsung Galaxy devices. Its main competition includes the Nokia Asha range and Firefox OS.
Currently, most devices are dual-SIM equipped and only released in the Indian market. The Samsung REX 90 was being also sold in CIS countries.

List of devices 
There are four mobile phones in the REX range ever released

REX 60 (also known as Samsung Champ Deluxe)
REX 70 (also available as single-SIM phone)
REX 80 (also known as Samsung Star 3, but with improved software)
REX 90

See also 
 Firefox OS
 Nokia Asha series

References 

Mobile phones introduced in 2013
Samsung smartphones
REX